"Smoke on the Water" is a song written by Zeke Clements and Earl Nunn and recorded by Red Foley in 1944. The patriotic song, which forecasts destruction for the Axis powers, particularly Japan, was Foley's first song to reach No. 1 on the Most-Played Juke Box Folk Records chart, spending 13 weeks at the top and a total of 24 weeks on the chart.  "Smoke on the Water" also peaked at No. 7 on the Most-Played Juke Box Records chart. The B-side, "There's a Blue Star Shining Bright (In a Window Tonight)", peaked at No. 5 on the Most-Played Juke Box Folk Records chart.

In 1945, Bob Wills and His Texas Playboys recorded the song, which also became a No. 1 song on the Most-Played Juke Box Folk Records chart. The B-side, a song entitled, "Hang Your Head in Shame" peaked at No. 3.

References 
 

1944 songs
1944 singles
Red Foley songs
Bob Wills songs
American patriotic songs
Songs of World War II
Songs written by Zeke Clements